"Constantly" is a song by IMx (then known as Immature), issued as the second single from the group's second album Playtyme Is Over. The song peaked at #16 on the Billboard Hot 100 in 1994. It was also the group's second consecutive gold single, having been certified on March 28, 1995.

Music video

The official music video for the song was directed by Steven Blake.

Chart positions

Weekly charts

Year-end charts

References

External links
 

1994 singles
IMx songs
Songs written by Jesse Powell
Songs written by Teron Beal
Songs written by Delroy Pearson
1994 songs
MCA Records singles